Magaly or Magali is a given name.

Magali may refer to:
Magali Amadei (born 1974), French fashion model
Magali Babin (born 1967), Canadian musician and composer
Magali Febles (born 1964), Dominican beauty pageant director
Magali Harvey (born 1990), Canadian rugby union player
Magali Le Floc'h (born 1975), French racing cyclist
Magali de Lattre (born 1987), Portuguese tennis player
Magali Lunel (born 1970), French television journalist
Magali Messmer (born 1971), Swiss triathlete
Magali Cornier Michael, feminist literary scholar
Magali Noël (1932–2015), French actress and singer
Magali García Ramis (born 1946), Puerto Rican writer
Magali Rathier (born 1974), French synchronized swimmer 
Magali Sauri (born 1977), French ice dancer
Magali Luyten (born 1978), Belgian heavy metal singer
Magali Tisseyre (born 1981), Canadian triathlete
Magali Villeneuve (born 1980), French fantasy illustrator
Maggy (Monica's Gang), the character created by Mauricio de Sousa and called Magali in Portuguese
Franka Magali (born 1990), Congolese sprinter
Magali kizhangu, Tamil name for Decalepis hamiltonii

Magaly may refer to:
Magaly Alabau (born 1945), Cuban poet and theater director
Magaly Carvajal (born 1968), Cuban volleyball player
Magaly Medina (born 1963), Peruvian television journalist
Magaly Ruiz (born 1941), Cuban musician and composer
Magaly Solier (born 1986), Peruvian actress and recording artist
Sophie & Magaly, French musical duo